The acronym IBAT may refer to:

 Ileal bile acid transporter, a protein also known as SLC10A2;
 Institute of Business Administration and Training in India;
 The Institute of Business and Technology (IBaT) in Dublin, Ireland;
 Interscapular brown adipose tissue, also known as Hibernating gland;
 Instruction Block Address Translation registers in PowerPC microprocessors.